Lauren Poe (born 1970/1971) is an American politician and former mayor of Gainesville, Florida, where he has lived since 1982. He served as mayor from 2016 to 2023, as well as city commissioner from 2013 to 2016.

Early life and career
Poe received his bachelor's degree in History, as well as his Master's in Social Sciences from the University of Florida.  He is married to Emily Monda-Poe.  Together they have 2 daughters, Elizabeth and Beatrice. He taught in Alachua County since 1998, first at Ft. Clarke Middle School and later Santa Fe College. He stepped down from his teaching position at Santa Fe College in 2021 citing health and family considerations.

Electoral history
Lauren Poe first ran to represent Gainesville's second district and won in 2008 in a close runoff election. Poe is a registered member of the Democratic Party and refers to himself as a "principled progressive," but all candidates in Gainesville municipal elections are officially non-partisan.

And the results from the runoff:

He ran for re-election and lost in the April 12, 2011 runoff after the March 15, 2011 election was also split between multiple candidates.

Runoff results:

The following year Poe won an at-large seat, also in a runoff.

Runoff results:

Poe was subsequently elected to mayor on March 15, 2016 beating his opponents, incumbent Ed Braddy and challenger Donald Shepherd with 57% of the vote (outright, without a runoff).

References

External links
 Official mayoral profile
 Legislative and public events calendar
 Local news candidate profile
 Political facebook page
 Official Campaign Page

Mayors of Gainesville, Florida
Florida Democrats
University of Florida alumni
Year of birth missing (living people)
Living people